{{Infobox film
| name           = DOA: Dead or Alive
| image          = DOA - Dead or Alive (movie poster).jpg
| alt            = Three female fighters standing ready 
| caption        = Theatrical release poster
| director       = Corey Yuen
| producer       = 
| screenplay     = 
| story          = J. F. Lawton
| based_on       = | starring       = 
| music          = Junkie XL
| cinematography = 
| editing        = 
| studio         = 
| distributor    = Constantin Film (Germany) Universal Pictures International (through United International Pictures; United Kingdom) Dimension Films (United States) Summit Entertainment (International)
| released       = 
| runtime        = 87 minutes
| country        = 
| language       = English 
| budget         = $30 million 
| gross          = $7.7 million
}}DOA: Dead or Alive is a 2006 martial arts action film based on the Tecmo/Team Ninja fighting video game franchise Dead or Alive. It is directed by Corey Yuen and written by J. F. Lawton and Adam and Seth Gross.

In the film, fighters are invited to Dead or Alive, an invitational martial arts contest. The four female fighters begin as rivals, but work together to uncover the secret that the organizer of the tournament is trying to hide. It features an ensemble cast and has various appearances from characters of the franchise, led by Kasumi (Devon Aoki), Christie Allen (Holly Valance) and Tina Armstrong (Jaime Pressly).

Principal photography took place from May to July 2005 in Bangkok, Guilin, Hengdian, and Hong Kong. It is an international co-production between Germany, United States and the United Kingdom.DOA: Dead or Alive was first released on September 7, 2006, in Australia. It was later released in the United Kingdom on September 15 by United International Pictures, and in Germany on October 19, 2006, by Constantin Film. The film was a critical and commercial failure, grossing only $7.7 million worldwide against a $30 million budget, making it a box-office bomb. Due to the film's poor performance, the United States release was delayed and the film was eventually given a limited release on June 15, 2007, by The Weinstein Company under Dimension Films. 

Plot
A group of martial arts and combat masters are invited to a fighting contest, "Dead or Alive", on an isolated island within an advanced complex, with the ultimate prize of $10 million. Among the competitors are Kasumi, a shinobi ninja-princess looking for her brother Hayate (who was competing in the last tournament), Tina, a professional wrestler setting out to prove she has more potential (complicated by her father Bass  being one of the contenders), Christie, a master thief and assassin, her treacherous partner Maximillian 'Max' Marsh, and Hayabusa, a friend of Kasumi and Hayate who follows Kasumi to keep her safe. A final competitor is Helena Douglas, daughter of the tournament's late founder. When they arrive, they are monitored by the island's supervisor, Dr. Victor Donovan, who, aided by egghead Weatherby, is gathering data (using injected nano-sensors) from the fights for some mysterious project. During the tournament, Max and Christie plan to steal the fortune stowed away inside a hidden vault. To add to the situation, an assassin from Kasumi's colony, named Ayane, has followed Kasumi to kill her and wipe away the disgrace the princess has caused to the clan.

The contest plays out, with multiple contestants fighting and being defeated (including Gen Fu, Bayman, Leon, and Zack), until only Kasumi, Christie, Hayabusa and Tina are left, with Helena being defeated by Christie. During her fight, Christie sees that the key to finding and unlocking the vault is a tattoo on the back of Helena's neck. Meanwhile, Kasumi begins to suspect Donovan of lying about her brother being killed in the previous tournament, and Hayabusa, infiltrating the main facility to find the truth, is captured. She is more than once confronted and nearly killed by Ayane, who Kasumi tries to convince that Hayate is alive (since it is eventually clear that Ayane loves Hayate). Also, Weatherby begins to fall for Helena, and in the end tells her about what he knows of the mystery project, and that before Helena's father could shut the project down, he died (indicating that he was murdered).

On the final day of the tournament, wondering where Hayabusa is, Kasumi, Christie and Tina look for him and discover a secret entrance to the main complex, where they find Hayabusa unconscious. They are then gassed and captured. Meanwhile, Helena resolves to stop the mystery project, and has to fight the armed staff of the island, sent to kill her and Weatherby by Donovan. They are followed inside by Max, who finds his way to the vault, and is then knocked out by Bayman, who is working for Donovan. Inside the main complex, Donovan shows the four semifinalists the project he has been developing; an advanced form of neural interface that allows him and others to use the fighters' combined skills to become the ultimate fighter. After 'downloading' the data into the device (shaped like a pair of sunglasses), he reveals that he kept Hayate alive and in peak condition to test the technology. He challenges Hayate to fight and win, if the others are to survive. Hayate accepts and is defeated, then thrown through a wall to die. Hayate is saved by Ayane, and the two of them apparently accept each other.

With the successful demonstration, Donovan prepares to sell the technology around the world, and begins "downloading" it to the watching buyers. Weatherby stops the broadcast and alerts the CIA, which provokes Donovan to head for them. Helena keeps Donovan back while Weatherby frees the others, but both are defeated and Donovan activates a self-destruct sequence which will obliterate the base. Kasumi, Helena, Christie, Tina, Ayane, and Hayate launch a combined attack on Donovan, while Hayabusa and Weatherby find Max and escape with him, despite Max's urge to go back for the money. During the fight, Donovan's 'glasses' are knocked off and he is easily paralyzed by Hayate and Kasumi. The fighters then all escape as the base explodes and Donovan is consumed by the flames. They take a boat from a group of pirates. 

Finally, Helena, Ayane, Christie, Tina, and Kasumi stand together again in Kasumi's palace preparing to fight an army of ninjas.

Cast

Additionally, Silvio Simac play Leon, an Italian mercenary, while Derek Boyer appear as Bayman, a Russian soldier. Chad McCord plays the detective who tries to arrest Christie in Hong Kong, Martin Crewes plays Tina's butler and Robin Shou appear as the pirate's chief. Several characters from the game series appear in minor roles played by stuntmen, include: Song Lin as Brad Wong, Fang Liu as Gen Fu, Hung Lin as Hitomi and Ying Wang as Leifang.

Production
Principal photography commenced on May 4, 2005, and concluded on July 19, 2005. Filming locations include Bangkok, Guilin, Hengdian, and Hong Kong. The production budget was estimated to be $30 million. The film was the first Western production shot largely in China's Hengdian World Studios, where Hero and House of Flying Daggers had shot.

Sarah Carter had worked with Natassia Malthe five times before and with Holly Valance three times. 
The actors trained together for three months before going to China, and trained for another month in China. Training included wu shu and kung fu, as well as wire training. The heat and humidity made the fight scenes particularly challenging. Another challenge was translation, on set people were speaking English, Cantonese, Mandarin, and the regional dialect of whatever area they were shooting in at the time.
Pressly had some previous experience with martial arts, training with her own trainer for nine years, and she had a recurring role in the Mortal Kombat television series. 
Valance had trained in muay thai since her teens, and found it made it more difficult to learn kung-fu as there were a lot of things she had to relearn.

Pressly praised the tireless work of director Corey Yuen and the crew, saying the crew worked two units, 17 hours a day, getting fours hours of sleep, and getting back up and doing it again.

Release
The film was first released September 7, 2006 in Australia. The film was released in North America on June 15, 2007, without press screenings. The Weinstein Company delayed the US release of the film by almost a year.

Box office
In non-North American markets, the film brought in over $7 million at the international box office, with almost $1 million in both the UK and Australia. In the US, the film made $260,713 in its opening weekend. It was released into 505 theaters, and spent 21 days in theaters, closing on July 5 with a domestic gross of $480,813 (about 6.4% of the worldwide gross at the time). The film grossed $7.7 million worldwide.

Critical response

Reviews were generally negative. The site's critics consensus reads, "With a ridiculous plot and comical acting, checking one's brain at the door is required before watching DOA: Dead or Alive." On Metacritic, the film has a weighted average score of 38 out of 100 based on 8 critics, indicating "generally unfavorable reviews".

Joe Leydon of Variety called it a "whirring blur of hot babes and cool fights" but complained the film is insubstantial and not enough even to appeal to genre fans with lowered expectations, suggesting it belongs in the video store and on late night television. He described the film as "a caffeinated mash-up" of Enter the Dragon, Mortal Kombat, Charlie's Angels and a few other films, but did praise Yuen for his show-stopping spectacles and compared an outdoor sword fight saying it "looks like a collaboration between Gene Kelly and Bruce Lee". Jack Mathews of the New York Daily News gave the film 1 out of 5 stars, calling it "laughably silly". He said the action was curiously bloodless, and the choreography not that good. Josh Rosenblatt of the Austin Chronicle panned the film, saying "the most glaring problem with DOA: not that it goes too far but that it doesn't go far enough" and called the film: "A piece of garbage and the best argument for reading books since the first pop-up appeared."L.A. Weekly gave the film a favorable review comparing it to Charlie's Angels and praising the director for providing "one of the year's purest entertainments" and "pretty much nonstop fighting, mostly in very little clothing, with the flair you expect from a master choreographer like Yuen. It's awesome." Entertainment Weekly's Gregory Kirschling gave it a grade "B" and wrote: "If you only ever see one bad movie about warrior chicks who meet on a tropical isle for a fight contest, make it DOA: Dead or Alive." Michael Ferraro from Film Threat credited the film with the unusual accomplishment of following the plot of the game series it is based on, even including a volleyball sequence, although he is critical there is not all that much plot. He described the acting and dialog as atrocious, and is bored by the action and fighting but calls the result hilarious, and suggested it as the kind of film you might watch with a group of drunken friends, adding your own commentary track. Kim Newman of The Times gave the film a positive review: "This is the best film yet adapted from a computer game — it doesn't even try to add depth and simply delivers what the fans expect (plenty of ninja babes) with as few trimmings as possible." In 2011 in the book "Nightmare Movies: Horror on Screen Since the 1960s" Newman wrote: "If I had to pick a game-based 'guilty pleasure', it would be DOA: Dead or Alive".

Of the performances, some critics were positive about Pressly, and negative about Aoki.

Home media

A DVD of DOA: Dead or Alive'' was released on September 11, 2007. In the first week, 68,578 units were sold in the United States, earning $1,370,874 and a #12 ranking on the week's DVD sales. In the United States and Canada, the DVD earned $1.9 million in domestic video sales.

See also
 List of films based on video games

References

External links
 
 DOA: Dead or Alive at LoveHKFilm.com

Dead or Alive (franchise)
2006 films
2000s action adventure films
2006 martial arts films
American martial arts films
American action adventure films
British action adventure films
British martial arts films
German action adventure films
English-language German films
Live-action films based on video games
Works based on Tecmo Koei video games
Constantin Film films
Dimension Films films
Universal Pictures films
Films directed by Corey Yuen
Films produced by Paul W. S. Anderson
Films scored by Junkie XL
Martial arts tournament films
Ninja films
Films set in Japan
Films set in Hong Kong
Films set on fictional islands
Films shot in China
Films shot in Guangxi
Films shot in Zhejiang
Films shot in Hong Kong
Films shot in Thailand
Films shot in Bangkok
2000s English-language films
2000s American films
2000s British films
2000s German films